The Keyhole may refer to:

Cinema
 The Keyhole (1933 film)

Places
 The Keyhole (Antarctica), a defile in Victoria Land.
 The Keyhole (Longs Peak), a rock gap on Longs Peak, Colorado, United States.
 The Keyhole (Mount Darwin), a rock gap on Mount Darwin, California, United States.

See also